Georgi Borisovich Takhokhov (born 26 September 1970) is a Tajikistani former professional footballer.

Club career
In 1992, he moved from Pamir Dushanbe to FC Spartak Vladikavkaz.

Career statistics

International

Statistics accurate as of 1 March 2016

References

External links
 
 

1970 births
Living people
Soviet footballers
Tajikistani footballers
Association football forwards
Tajikistani expatriate footballers
Tajikistan international footballers
Russian Premier League players
FC Spartak Vladikavkaz players
CSKA Pamir Dushanbe players
Expatriate footballers in Russia
Tajikistani football managers
FC Slavyansk Slavyansk-na-Kubani players